Eugene Kornel Balon (Polish: Eugeniusz Kornel Bałon, Czech: Evžen Kornel Balon) (1 August 1930, Orlová – 4 September 2013, Guelph) was a Polish Canadian and Czech zoologist and ichthyologist.

Biography
He went to the Polish High School in Orlová, Zaolzie where he took his A levels in 1949. He graduated from the Charles University in Prague. In the years 1953–1967 he worked in the Slovak Academy of Sciences in Bratislava where he studied the endemic fauna of Danube. From 1967 to 1967 he was an UN expert in Zambia. After 1976, he was a teacher on the University of Guelph.

Two species of fishes were named after him: Balon's ruffe (Gymnocephalus baloni) and Tilapia baloni.

Publications
 Balon, EK, 1979. The theory of saltation and its application in the ontogeny of fishes: steps and thresholds. Environmental Biology of Fishes, 1979, Volume 4, Number 2, Pages 97–101. Online
 Balon, EK, 2001. Saltatory Ontogeny and the Life-History Model: Neglected Processes and Patterns of Evolution. Journal of Bioeconomics, 2001, Volume 3, Number 1, Pages 1–26. Online
 Balon, EK, 2002. Epigenetic Processes, when Natura Non Facit Saltum Becomes a Myth, and Alternative Ontogenies a Mechanism of Evolution Environmental Biology of Fishes. Volume 65, Number 1, Pages 1–35. Online
 Balon, EK, 2004. Evolution by epigenesis: Farewell to Darwinism, Neo-and Otherwise. Rivista di Biologia / Biology Forum 97: 269–312. Online

Further reading
 Bałon, Eugeniusz in: /
 
 
 Obituary at LifeNews.ca

References

1930 births
2013 deaths
People from Orlová
Polish people from Zaolzie
Canadian ichthyologists
Polish ichthyologists
Czechoslovak zoologists
20th-century Canadian zoologists
Polish emigrants to Canada
Czechoslovak emigrants to Canada
Charles University alumni
Academic staff of the University of Guelph